In the United States, a registered nurse certified in maternal newborn nursing (RNC-MNN) is a obstetrical nurse who has earned a nursing board certification from the National Certification Corporation in maternal/newborn nursing.

See also

List of nursing credentials

External links
National Certification Corporation website

Nursing credentials and certifications
Neonatology